The Odense River is a river located on the island of Funen, in central Denmark. Boats can be rented by the river, offering a scenic ride to Fruens Bøge. Excursion boats offer rides to Carlslund, with jazz music some Saturdays during the Summer.

During the Viking Age, the fortress Nonnebakken ensured its controller supremacy over the river.

Geography of Odense
Rivers of Denmark